Ri Bhoi is an administrative district in the state of Meghalaya in India. The district headquarters are located at Nongpoh. The district occupies an area of 2378 km² and has a population of 258,840 (as of 2011). As of 2011 it is the second least populous district of Meghalaya (out of 7), after South Garo Hills.

History
The district was upgraded from subdivisional level to a full-fledged district on 4 June 1992. The new District, was carved out from East Khasi Hills.

Geography
The District lies between 90°55’15 to 91°16’ latitude and 25°40’ to 25°21’ longitude. It is bounded on the north by Kamrup District and on the East by Jaintia Hills and Karbi Anglong District of Assam and on the West by West Khasi Hills District. There are three C and RD Blocks and one administrative unit at Patharkhmah, and the number of villages is 561. Ri Bhoi District covers an area of 2448 km².

The headquarters of the District is at Nongpoh located at 53 km away from the state capital Shillong and 50 km from Guwahati. This District is characterized by rugged and irregular land surface. It includes a series of hill ranges which gradually sloped towards the north and finally joins the Brahmaputra Valley. The important rivers flowing through this region includes the Umtrew, Umsiang, Umran and Umiam rivers.

Flora and fauna

Economy
In 2006 the Ministry of Panchayati Raj named Ri-Bhoi one of the country's 250 most backward districts (out of a total of 640). It is one of the three districts in Meghalaya currently receiving funds from the Backward Regions Grant Fund Programme (BRGF).

Administration

Administrative divisions
Ri-Bhoi district is divided into three blocks:

Transport
The region is the best in connectivity in the whole state having the only airport at Umroi, the Four-lane from Jorobat to Lad-Umroi and the Shillong Bye-pass in Umroi-Bhoirymbong area to Mawryngkneng of East Khasi Hills and the District is the main connectivity to Assam, Mizoram, Tripura, Manipur, Nagaland and other stations of Meghalaya. The National Highway No.37 origination from Jorabat to Shillong passes through the District.

Demographics

Population
According to the 2011 census Ri-Bhoi district has a population of 258,840, roughly equal to the nation of Vanuatu. This gives it a ranking of 580th in India (out of a total of 640). Its population growth rate over the decade 2001-2011 was 34.02%. Ri Bhoi has a sex ratio of 951 females for every 1000 males, and a literacy rate of 77.22%. Scheduled Tribes make up 88.89% of the population.

Religion
Christians are the majority.

Languages

Khasi is the main language of the area. The main dialect spoken in Ri-Bhoi is Karow which is spoken in Nongpoh and its surrounding localities and the other native spoken dialects are Iapngar in Ri Bhoi and Mihngi, Nongtung in Far Eastern Ri Bhoi, Mynar in Far Western Ri Bhoi and Jirang area. It is more popularly known to other people as the Bhoi language. Languages used in the district include Amri, a Tibeto-Burman language related with Karbi, with 125 000 speakers and Tiwa spoken by around 2,000 Tiwas. There are number of tribes exist in Ri-Bhoi like Marngars and Mikirs.

References

External links 
 Ri Bhoi district website

 
1992 establishments in Meghalaya
Districts of Meghalaya
Autonomous regions of India